Alum Springs is a ghost town in Greenbrier County, West Virginia, United States. Alum Springs appeared on USGS maps as late as 1923.

References

Former populated places in Greenbrier County, West Virginia
Ghost towns in West Virginia